Donald Paterson  (born 1963 in Dundee) is a Scottish poet, writer and musician.

Career
Paterson won an Eric Gregory Award in 1990 and his poem "A Private Bottling" won the Arvon Foundation International Poetry Competition in 1993. He was included on the list of 20 poets chosen for the Poetry Society's 1994 "New Generation Poets" promotion. In 2002 he was awarded a Scottish Arts Council Creative Scotland Award.

His first collection of poetry, Nil Nil (1993), won the Forward Poetry Prize for Best First Collection. God's Gift to Women (1997) won the T. S. Eliot Prize and the Geoffrey Faber Memorial Prize. The Eyes, adaptations of the work of Spanish poet Antonio Machado (1875–1939), was published in 1999. He is also editor of 101 Sonnets: From Shakespeare to Heaney (1999) and of Last Words: New Poetry for the New Century (1999) with Jo Shapcott. His collection of poems, Landing Light (2003), won both the 2003 T. S. Eliot Prize and the 2003 Whitbread Poetry Award. He has also published three collections of aphorisms, The Book of Shadows (2004), The Blind Eye (2007) and Best Thought, Worst Thought (2008). Orpheus, his version of Rilke's Die Sonette an Orpheus, was published in 2006.

Paterson teaches in the school of English at the University of St Andrews and was the poetry editor for London publishers Picador for over 25 years. An accomplished jazz guitarist, he works solo and for ten years ran the jazz-folk ensemble Lammas with Tim Garland.

In 2012, Paterson wrote an open letter in The Herald criticising Scotland's arts funding council Creative Scotland.

In 2012–2013, he was the Weidenfeld Visiting Professor of European Comparative Literature in St Anne's College, Oxford.

Paterson's memoir Toy Fights: A Boyhood was published by Faber in January 2023.

Honours and awards
He was appointed Officer of the Order of the British Empire (OBE) in the 2008 Birthday Honours. He was awarded the Queen's Gold Medal for Poetry in the 2010 New Year Honours. In 2015 Paterson was elected a Fellow of the Royal Society of Edinburgh.

Bibliography

Poetry 
Collections
  (winner of the Forward Poetry Prize for Best First Collection)
 
The Eyes after Machado, Faber and Faber, 1999,  
White Lie, Graywolf Press, 2001,  
Landing Light, 2003
Orpheus after Rilke, 2006
  (winner of Forward Poetry Prize)
Selected Poems, Faber and Faber, 2012,  
40 Sonnets,  Faber and Faber, 2015,  (shortlisted for the 2016 Griffin Poetry Prize)
Contributor to A New Divan: A Lyrical Dialogue Between East and West, Gingko Library, 2019, 
Zonal, Faber and Faber, 2020, 
The Arctic, Faber and Faber, 2022, 

Anthologies
101 Sonnets, 1999
Last Words, 1999, with (Jo Shapcott)
Robert Burns, poems selected by Don Paterson, 2001
New British Poetry with Charles Simic, Grayworf Press, 2004, 

List of poems

Plays
The Land of Cakes (with Gordon McPherson) (2001)
A'body's Aberdee (2001)

Radio drama
Kailyard Blues (1999)
Ringing the Changes (1999) with (Jo Shapcott)
The Aberdee Brief (2000)
The Latecomers (2001)

Aphorisms
The Book of Shadows Picador, 2004,  
The Blind Eye (2007)
Best Thought, Worst Thought (2008)

Criticism
 
Smith: A Reader's Guide to the Poetry of Michael Donaghy (2014)

Critical studies and reviews of Paterson's work

References

External links

Poet's official website
"Private Enterprise for the Public Good" John Stammers interviews Don Paterson. No 12 - Spring 1998 Magma
Paterson profile at Poetry Foundation
Profile at Scottish Poetry Library
Biography and bibliography at British Council Contemporary Writers site
Biography, poetry excerpts from Griffin Poetry Prize website

1963 births
Living people
Academics of the University of St Andrews
Aphorists
Costa Book Award winners
Fellows of the Royal Society of Edinburgh
Fellows of the Royal Society of Literature
Formalist poets
Journalists from Dundee
Musicians from Dundee
Officers of the Order of the British Empire
People from Dundee
Poets from Dundee
Print editors
Scottish journalists
Scottish poets
The New Yorker people
T. S. Eliot Prize winners